Gaudenzio Marconi (1841–1885) was an Italian photographer who worked in France. He sold académies (photographic figure studies) to students at the École des beaux-arts (School of Fine Arts) in Paris. Accomplished artists and students often sketched the figure from photographs when living models were not available or proved too costly. The poses were generally imitations of those used in the sculptures of classical antiquity and the Renaissance. His photographs were used by famous artists such as Auguste Rodin for their works.

Notes

1841 births
1885 deaths
Italian photographers